Bertie Watson (13 March 1898 – 18 November 1987) was an Australian cricketer. He played two first-class matches for New South Wales in 1927/28.

See also
 List of New South Wales representative cricketers

References

External links
 

1898 births
1987 deaths
Australian cricketers
New South Wales cricketers